Imran Shah (born 23 November 1933), also known as Nawab Imran Shah is an Indian Assamese language writer, poet, novelist, and scholar. He also writes under the pen names Ishan Dutta, Anamika Baruah, Kumbhakarna, and Animesh Baruah. The Government of India awarded him the fourth highest civilian honour of the Padma Shri, in 2021, for his contributions to literature and education.

Early life 
Imran Shah was born on 23 November 1933 in Sivasagar, Assam. He was the youngest child of Muhammad Shah and Mariam Nessa.

Shah attended '2 Nong Dhai Ali Prathamik Vidyalaya' (No. 2 Dhai Ali Primary School), followed by attendance at the Government High School, Sivasagar. In 1952, he enrolled in the ISC course at Cotton College, Guwahati, and in 1958, he was awarded a Bachelor of Arts degree from Sivasagar College. He earned his M.A  in Assamese language from Gauhati University.

Professional background

Teaching career
Shah started his professional career as a temporary teacher at Konwarpur High School, Sivasagar and later joined the staff at Sivasagar High Madrassa School, after completing his ISC. Upon gaining his M.A. degree from Gauhati University he joined Gargaon College as a lecturer in Assamese in 1962. From there he moved a year later to become a lecturer in Assamese at Sivasagar College, from which he retired as Head of the Department in 1993. During his retirement, he established Arunudoi College, a junior college near his home and served as its principal.

Writing and editing career
Shah began writing while still in school. His first book of poems Banvashi was published when he was in the ninth standard. The following year, when he was in the tenth standard, his first novel, Sangeetor Hkhipare was published. He wrote poetry in Ramdhenu under the pen name Ishan Dutta. His first short story, "Aparicheeta" was published in 1958, in Natun Asomiya and edited by Kirtinath Hazarika.

He edited Bosoror Galpa, an anthology of selected Assamese short stories, from 1982 to 1984, as well as editing, with Arun Goswami, Kalantarar Kathakata – another anthology of Assamese short stories, from 1961 to 1975.

Two of his written works were made translated into other mediums. His novel Jabanbandi was broadcast as a radio-recitation by Akaashvani, Dibrugarh. In addition, the Assamese film Rasmirekha, is based on his novel, Rajanigandha, and was released in 1973, produced by Prafulla Baruah.

He was elected as the president of Asam Sahitya Sabha, the state's literary body located in Barpeta Road for the 2013-2015 session.

Published works 
 Banavashi (Book of Poems)
 Sangeetor Hkhipaare (Novel)
 Aparicheeta
 Kranti Rekha (Novel)
 Bondho Duwar (Novel)
 Kreetodasor hahi (Translated novel)
 Jabanbandi (Novel)
 Mur Phulanir Phool (Prose collection)
 Asomiya Sangskritiloi Musalmanor Avadaan (Lecture)
 Dhou Bhangi Dhou
 Nisanga Dhusar (Book of Poems)
 'Kukuhaa (2012)' (latest short story collection)
 Ishan Duttar Nirbachito Kavita (Book of Poems)
 Shikhar Minoti
 Sagarikaa Novel)
 Barnali (Novel)
 Kavi Pulish (Novel)
 Banjyotshna (Novel)
 Tansen (Novel)
 Tathapi Sagar (Novel)
 Inkilaab (Translated Novel)
 Junakor Chobi (Translated Novel)
 Bosoror Galpa (1962, 1963, 1964) (Editor)
 Kalantoror Kothokotha (Editor)
 Vishwa Bandhu (Biography)
 Bandi Bihonggome Kaande
 Patheek
 Ityaadi
 Piyamukh Chanda
 Poora Maatir Malita
 Sparsharekha
 Imran Shahor Nirbachito Galpa
 Xoru Xoru Kotha (2013) *collection of articles*

Honors and awards 
 Assam Valley Literary Award, 2010
 Ajan Peer Bota by Government of Assam
 President of Asam Sahitya Sabha (2013)
 Padma Shri, 2021

References

External links
 

1933 births
Asom Sahitya Sabha Presidents
Assamese-language poets
Poets from Assam
Living people
People from Sivasagar district
Recipients of the Assam Valley Literary Award
Novelists from Assam
20th-century Indian poets
20th-century Indian novelists
Recipients of the Padma Shri in literature & education